Millard is an unincorporated community in Dickenson County, Virginia, in the United States.

History
A post office was established at Millard in 1903, and remained in operation until it was discontinued in 1958. The community was named for Millard Rose, a local resident.

References

Unincorporated communities in Dickenson County, Virginia
Unincorporated communities in Virginia